Stadio Primo Nebiolo is a baseball stadium located in Messina, Italy. It was built in 1998, and was named after the former president of the IAAF, Primo Nebiolo. Hosted rounds of the 1998 Baseball World Cup and 2009.

Gallery

See also
1998 Baseball World Cup
2009 Baseball World Cup

External links
 Impianti Contrada Conca d'Oro
 Lo stadio del baseball dell'Università di Messina
 Italian Baseball and Softball Federation

1998 establishments in Italy
20th century in Sicily
Primo Nebiolo
Sport in Messina
Primo Nebiolo
Primo Nebiolo